FC Spartak Sumy was a Ukrainian football club based in Sumy.

History

Yavir was established on January 12, 1982 at the village forestry Krasnopillya. In Ukrainian Yavir means Sycamore (Acer pseudoplatanus). The team started playing in the regional championship and after couple of years became the regional champion. The following year it won the regional cup.

In the first national championship of Ukraine Yavir Krasnopillya became involved in the professional leagues, first in the Ukrainian Second League, then in the 1992. In 1995, Yavir Krasnopillya won the second league 

Around that time, the established local teams in Sumy – FC Frunzenets Sumy and FC Avtomobilist Sumy suddenly folded and disappeared altogether. As a result of this, the regional leaders decided to revive football in Sumy. With this purpose in 1998, Yavir was transferred to the regional center and renamed Yavir-Sumy. As such, the club lasted half the season, then transformed into FC Sumy, and once more into Spartak Sumy. From 2003, the team was called Spartak-Horobyna Sumy.

In the 2006–07 season they played in the Ukrainian First League. However, the club was withdrawn from the league (and subsequently folded) after missing two Ukrainian First League matches due to financial difficulties.

Previous names of the club
 1982–1998 – Football Club Yavir Krasnopillya
 1999–2000 – Football Club Yavir-Sumy
 2000–2001 – Football Club Spartak Sumy
 2002 – Football Club Sumy
 2003 – Football Club Spartak Sumy
 2004 – 2005 – Football Club Spartak-Horobyna Sumy
 2005–2006 – Football Club Spartak Sumy

Stadium
Former
Yuvileiny Stadium

Former
Kolos Stadium (3,000)

Honors
Ukrainian Druha Liha
Winners (2): 1994–95, 2001–02 (as FC Sumy)
Sumy Oblast Football Championship
Winners (1): 1984

League and cup history

See also
FC Yavir Krasnopilya
FC Avtomobilist Sumy
FC Frunzenets Sumy

References

External links
 Buha, B. ''There rustled "Yavir"... (Шумів «Явір»…) . Football Federation of Ukraine. 1 September 2010

 
Spartak Sumy, FC
Football clubs in Sumy
Sports team relocations
Association football clubs established in 1982
Association football clubs disestablished in 2007
1982 establishments in Ukraine
2007 disestablishments in Ukraine